Jason Royce Dickson (born March 30, 1973) is a Canadian former professional baseball pitcher.

Dickson is a graduate of Northeastern Oklahoma A&M College. He played for the Somerset Patriots and was drafted by the California Angels in the 6th round of the 1994 MLB Amateur Draft. He was part of Team Canada in the 2004 Summer Olympics which finished in fourth place.

Called up to the Angels squad on August 21, 1996, the first batter he faced was Derek Jeter, who homered off Dickson's third Major League pitch.

Dickson was named to the 1997 Major League Baseball All-Star Game as a 24-year-old representing the Anaheim Angels. He finished his first full season with 13 wins and a 4.29 ERA but struggled the next year, going 10–10 with a 6.05 ERA.

Over four seasons in the majors, Dickson had a 26–25 record and 4.99 career ERA. However, injuries all but nullified his once promising career.

In 1996, he won the Canadian Baseball Hall of Fame's Tip O'Neill Award.

Raised in Miramichi, New Brunswick, Dickson has been a supporter of the New Brunswick Liberals and campaigned for them in the 2003 election.  It was reported in the March 7, 2006 Times & Transcript that he was considering running for the Liberals in the next provincial election.  He ran for and lost the right to run for the Liberals in the riding of Miramichi-Bay du Vin at a May 28, 2006 nominating convention.  He placed third in a field of four candidates with 91 of 531 votes.

He is now a pitcher for the Chatham Ironmen of the New-Brunswick Senior Baseball League.

On June 22, 2016, he was acclaimed as Baseball Canada President at the organization's Annual General Meeting in Toronto.

See also
List of Major League Baseball players from Canada

References

 http://www.baseball.ca/baseball-canada-elects-new-executive-jason-dickson-acclaimed-as-baseball-canada-president

External links
 , or Baseball Reference (Minor and Independent leagues), or Pura Pelota (Venezuelan Winter League)
 
 
 

1973 births
American League All-Stars
Anaheim Angels players
Baseball people from New Brunswick
Baseball players at the 2004 Summer Olympics
Boise Hawks players
California Angels players
Canadian expatriate baseball players in the United States
Cedar Rapids Kernels players
Dunedin Blue Jays players
Durham Bulls players
Edmonton Trappers players
Living people
Major League Baseball pitchers
Major League Baseball players from Canada
Midland Angels players
Northeastern Oklahoma A&M Golden Norsemen baseball players
Olympic baseball players of Canada
Omaha Royals players
People from Miramichi, New Brunswick
Somerset Patriots players
Sportspeople from London, Ontario
Syracuse SkyChiefs players
Tennessee Smokies players
Tiburones de La Guaira players
Canadian expatriate baseball players in Venezuela
Vancouver Canadians players